Phuentenchu Gewog (Dzongkha: སྤུང་རྟེན་ཆུ་) is a gewog (village block) of Tsirang District, Bhutan.

References

Gewogs of Bhutan
Tsirang District